Gorenje ( or ) is a settlement in the Municipality of Šmartno ob Paki in northern Slovenia. It lies on the right bank of the Paka River northwest of Šmartno. The area is part of the traditional region of Styria. The municipality is now included in the Savinja Statistical Region.

The local church is dedicated to Saint John the Baptist and belongs to the Parish of Šmartno. It is a medieval church that was greatly rebuilt in the 18th century.

References

External links
Gorenje at Geopedia

Populated places in the Municipality of Šmartno ob Paki